Paul Romrell (born in Fremont County, Idaho) is a Republican Idaho State Representative since 2012 representing District 35 in the B seat.

Education 
Romrell graduated from South Fremont High School and Ricks College (now Brigham Young University–Idaho, and studied through Boise State University.

Elections

References

External links 
Paul Romrell at the Idaho Legislature
Campaign site
 

Year of birth missing (living people)
Living people
Boise State University alumni
Brigham Young University–Idaho alumni
Republican Party members of the Idaho House of Representatives
People from St. Anthony, Idaho
21st-century American politicians